Part-e Kola (also Romanized as Pārt-e Kolā, Pārt Kalā, and Pārt Kolā) is a village in Farim Rural District, Dodangeh District, Sari County, Mazandaran Province, Iran. In the 2006 census, its population was 221 people, from 59 families.

References 

Populated places in Sari County